The Sancheong and Hamyang massacre (Hanja: 山清・咸陽良民虐殺事件) was a massacre conducted by a unit of the South Korean Army 11th Division during the Korean War.  On 7 February 1951,  705 unarmed citizens in Sancheong and Hamyang, South Gyeongsang district of South Korea were killed. The victims were civilians and 85% of them were women, children and elderly people. The 11th Division also conducted the Geochang massacre two days later. The division's commanding general was Choe Deok-sin.

On 20 February 2006, the National Archives of Korea reported that files concerning the massacre had been found.

On 7 November 2008, a memorial park for the victims was established in Sancheong.

See also
List of massacres in South Korea
Truth and Reconciliation Commission (South Korea)

References

External links
 산청 시천면 양민학살, 어떤 사건인가? 아녀자, 어린이 대부분...알려진 산청 함양사건과는 별개출처:산청 시천면 양민학살, 어떤 사건인가? – 오마이뉴스 OhmyNews 16 May 2000

Massacres in South Korea
Political repression in South Korea
Political and cultural purges
History of South Gyeongsang Province
Massacres committed by South Korea
Korean War crimes
South Korean war crimes
War crimes in South Korea
1951 in South Korea
Mass murder in 1951
Anti-communism in South Korea
February 1951 events in Asia
1951 murders in South Korea
Massacres in 1951